Khudunabari refugee camp (Nepali: खुदुनाबारी शरणार्थी शिविर; Khudunābārī śaraṇārthī śivira), located to the northwest of Sanischare, Kosi, Nepal, is home to some 10,688 Bhutanese refugees. The camp lies at a river confluence, between Sanischare Road and Limbuwan Road 37.

See also
Bhutanese refugees

References

Refugee camps in Nepal
Bhutanese refugee camps